Billy Martin (1928–1989) was a Major League Baseball player and manager.

Billy Martin or Bill Martin may also refer to:

Music
 Bill Martin (songwriter) (1938– 2020), Scottish songwriter
 Billy Martin (percussionist) (born 1963), drummer for jazz trio Medeski Martin & Wood
 William E. Martin (1945–2016), American songwriter, screenwriter, and voice actor
 Billy Martin (guitarist) (born 1981), guitarist for American band Good Charlotte
 Bill Martin, a briefly-used stage name of Billy Joel around 1972
 Billy Martin, an alias used by Paul McCartney to record his debut solo album, McCartney, in Abbey Road Studios

Sports
 C. W. Martin (1887–1978), known as Bill, head football coach at the University of North Carolina at Chapel Hill, 1912
 Billy Martin (shortstop) (1894–1949), American baseball player
 Billy Martin (curler) (born c. 1933), Canadian curler
 Bill Martin (cyclist) (1895–1901), Winner of the 1901 Austral Wheel Race
 Billy Martin (halfback) (1938–1976), American football player
 Billy Martin (tight end) (1942–2018), American football player
 Billy Martin (tennis) (born 1956), American tennis player in the 1970s
 Bill Martin (basketball) (born 1962), American basketball player
 Bill Martin (rugby league), rugby league footballer of the 1960s for Great Britain and Workington Town
 Bill Martin (footballer) (1883–1954), English footballer
 Bill Martin (athletic director), American college athletics administrator

Writers
 Bill Martin Jr. (1916–2004), American children's book author
 Billy Martin (author) (born 1967), known professionally as Poppy Z. Brite, American author

Other
 Bill Martin (artist) (1943–2008), California visionary painter
 Bill Martin (philosopher) (born 1956), American philosopher at DePaul University
 Bill Martin (sociologist), Australian sociologist
 Billy Martin (lawyer), lawyer with Dorsey & Whitney LLP
 Bill Martin (politician), American politician

See also
William Martin (disambiguation)
William Flynn Martin (born 1950), American energy economist, educator and international diplomat